Scobberlotchers is a 2016 album by Scottish musician Momus. It was released on 9 September 2016 by independent record label American Patchwork on CD and distributed by Darla Records.

Background 
The album was recorded between June and August 2016 in Osaka, Japan where Momus resided at the time. Momus has stated that the LP has been his "polemical response to Brexit and Trump."

Reception 
Darla Records founder James Agren praised the album saying "[Momus]'s perspective/world view/filter is my absolute favorite of all artists today." Yahoo! Musics Dave DiMartino ranked Scobberlotchers third on his list "Best Albums of 2016." Now Thens Zachary Freeman reviewed the album favorably with "references to figures as diverse as Ezra Pound, Henry Darger, Theresa May and Fernando Pessoa demonstrate Momus's propensity to tackle more subject matter in an individual album than most groups achieve in their entire discography."

Track listing

References

External links 

2016 albums
Momus (musician) albums